Edel Therese Høiseth (born 27 January 1966) is a former speed skater from Norway, who specialised in the shorter distances; the 500 m and 1,000 m.

Høiseth skated in all Winter Olympics from 1984 to 1998, making her one of only three Norwegians to have participated in as many as five Winter Olympics (the other two being Oddvar Brå and Petter Thoresen). Her best Olympic result is an eighth place on the 500 m at the 1994 Winter Olympics. One of her best seasons was 1996, when she won the silver medal at the World Sprint Championships behind Chris Witty. Throughout her unusually long career at international top level, she also won more than 40 Norwegian Championships in Allround, Sprint, and Single Distance (500 m, 1,000 m, and 1,500 m). In 2000, on two occasions in Calgary, she achieved times of 1:15.37 and 1:15.47 on the 1,000 m; the world record at that time was Monique Garbrecht's 1:14.61. Høiseth's best 500 m time is 38.40.

Medals
An overview of medals won by Høiseth at important championships she participated in, listing the years in which she won each:

Personal records
To put these personal records in perspective, the WR column lists the official world records on the dates that Høiseth skated her personal records.

Høiseth has an Adelskalender score of 172.619 points.

References 
 Edel Therese Høiseth at SkateResults.com
 Edel Therese Høiseth. Deutsche Eisschnelllauf Gemeinschaft e.V. (German Skating Association).
 Personal records from Jakub Majerski's Speedskating Database
 Evert Stenlund's Adelskalender pages
 Historical World Records. International Skating Union.
 National Championships results. Norges Skøyteforbund (Norwegian Skating Association).

External links 
 

1966 births
Living people
Norwegian female speed skaters
Olympic speed skaters of Norway
Speed skaters at the 1984 Winter Olympics
Speed skaters at the 1988 Winter Olympics
Speed skaters at the 1992 Winter Olympics
Speed skaters at the 1994 Winter Olympics
Speed skaters at the 1998 Winter Olympics
Lesbian sportswomen
Norwegian LGBT sportspeople
LGBT speed skaters